During the 1962–63 season Hearts competed in the Scottish First Division, the Scottish Cup, the Scottish League Cup.

Fixtures

Friendlies

League Cup

Scottish Cup

Scottish First Division

See also
List of Heart of Midlothian F.C. seasons

References

Statistical Record 62-63

External links
Official Club website

Heart of Midlothian F.C. seasons
Heart of Midlothian